The Malaysian Red Crescent Society (MRCS) is a voluntary humanitarian organization that seeks to promote humanitarian values, as well as provide service and public education in disaster management, as well as healthcare in the community. It is part of the International Red Cross and Red Crescent Movement.

Organised in 16 branches and more than 150 chapters nationwide, the Malaysian Red Crescent is headquartered in Kuala Lumpur. The Malaysian Red Crescent also has a very active presence among youths and young adults through a well-organized network of youth and adult volunteer units in schools and institutions of higher learning.

History

Formation of society
The Malaysian Red Crescent has its beginnings in 1948 as branches of the British Red Cross Society in the former British North Borneo (now the Malaysian state of Sabah) and Sarawak. In 1950, the British Red Cross Society established the first branch in Penang in the Federation of Malaya from which it rapidly expanded its presence in the other states.

Upon the independence of the Federation of Malaya on 31 August 1957, the branches in Malaya were reorganised as the Federation of Malaya Red Cross Society and the society was officially incorporated by statute with the passing of the Federation of Malaya Red Cross Society (Incorporation) Act 1962 by Parliament. On 4 July 1963, the Federation of Malaya Red Cross Society received official recognition as an independent national society by the International Committee of the Red Cross and subsequently admitted as a member of the League of Red Cross Societies on 24 August 1963.

With the formation of the larger federation of Malaysia on 16 September 1963, the Malaysian Red Cross Society (Incorporation) Act 1965 to incorporate the Federation of Malaya Red Cross Society and the branches of the Red Cross Society in Sabah and Sarawak under the name of the Malaysian Red Cross Society was passed by Parliament and gazetted on 1 July 1965. On 5 September 1975, the Malaysian Red Cross Society was renamed the Malaysian Red Crescent Society by the passing of the Malaysian Red Cross Society (Change of Name) Act 1975 by Parliament.

Leadership 
Datuk Ruby Lee was the first secretary general for the Malaysian Red Crescent Society, serving the post for 32 years from 1965 to 1996.

Mandate 

As defined in the MRCS Constitution, it shall be the duty of the Society to perform the following:
 Maintain a permanent and active uniform organisation to save lives, reduce suffering, damage and losses and; to protect, comfort and support affected people, especially casualties of armed conflicts, disasters or other emergencies irrespective of nationality, race, class, gender, creed, language, age, disability, ethnicity, social background, political considerations and any other similar grounds;
 Promote knowledge of international humanitarian law and the Fundamental Principles of the Movement, strategies and policies of the Federation and the Movement, social inclusion and a culture of non-violence and peace in order to develop humanitarian ideals among the population and in particular among children and youth;
 Contribute to the improvement of health, the prevention of disease and the mitigation of suffering to enable healthy and safe living;
 Promote the participation of children and young people in the work of the Society and to strengthen the international friendship amongst Red Cross and Red Crescent Youth all over the world;
 Cooperate with the Government and local authorities and other voluntary organisations engaged in work similar to that of the Society provided that the Society retains administrative control over its own funds, personnel and material and to take all necessary steps to prevent the illegal use or abuse of the Red Cross / Red Crescent name and emblem;
 Promote and maintain public interest in the activities of the Society and to rely for the running of its administration on voluntary contributions, donations and approved income generating activities and as much as possible to give free services provided that the Society may receive income derived from the Society’s property (movable or immovable) or investments provided also that grants in aid may be accepted from the Government, local authorities and private organisations for meeting the expenses of any specified service undertaken by the Society;
 Promote the formation of Chapters, Branches and Units and exercise control over their activities;
 Consider and approve in appropriate cases recommendations for the bestowal of distinctions, medals and badges of the Society, the Movement, Federal and State awards and to take all the necessary steps to prevent the unauthorised use of the Society’s name, uniform, medals and badges.

Activities

Ambulance service 
The Malaysian Red Crescent runs a 24-hour ambulance service throughout the nation which consists of over 50 ambulance units in 16 branches.

First aid training 
The MRC also initiated a programme called "A First Aider in Every Home". The objective of the programme is to have at least 1 person trained in first aid in every Malaysian family.

Disaster response 
On December 25, 1996, the Malaysian state of Sabah in Borneo was hit by Tropical Storm Greg. In response, the MRC manned 3 relief centres for the victims and distributed food to those affected.

After the 2004 Indian Ocean Tsunami caused damage to the coastal areas of Perlis, Penang and Kedah, the MRC appealed for donations and volunteers responded to the disaster. Temporary shelters were set up for the victims who lost their homes. Food and water was also distributed among the victims.

In 2015, the state of Sabah was hit by an earthquake. The MRC launched a relief effort and volunteers responded to the disaster.

COVID-19 pandemic response 
During the 2020 COVID-19 Pandemic, the MRCS launched the #responsMALAYSIA (Malaysia's response) programme. The programme aims to providing a platform for individuals and corporate entities to contribute towards the procurement of essential items required by frontliners, as well as drive MRCS's community engagement efforts.

MRCS also implemented three rounds of perception survey funded by The World Health Organization (WHO) and supported by the International Federation of Red Cross/Red Crescent Societies (IFRC) to gather the attitude, concerns, and information needs of the people about the COVID-19 pandemic.

MRCS held a photo exhibition at Rumah Tangsi in Kuala Lumpur in March 2022 to showcase its vaccination initiatives for the underserved community during the pandemic. Over a period of eight months, MRCS administered over 50,000 vaccinations across 15 states, often having to trek off-road to serve remote communities. These mobile vaccinations outside the main vaccination centres (PPVs) started with the bedridden and OKU community, before expanding to the Orang Asli communities, migrants, asylum seekers, the homeless, and adolescents.

In August 2022, MRCS received a RM5mil grant-in-aid for vaccine and booster doses from the Australian Government through the Australian Red Cross.

Restoring Family Links 
MRCS supported ICRC (International Committee of the Red Cross) in providing Restoring Family Links service in five immigration detention depots, ie. Bukit Jalil, Semenyih, Lenggeng, Langkap and Belantik. The purpose of this service is to assist detainees to reconnect with their families to notify of their conditions and to get assistance such as documentation or flight ticket. Services provided are Red Cross Message, telephone, notifications to either or both their Embassies and UNHCR. The service is normally carried out between 3-5 days with the assistance of volunteers and staff of MRCS.

International humanitarian law (IHL) 
On 19 May 2022, MRCS launched a handbook that was jointly developed with the ICRC to promote IHL among members of the parliament. Titled "Promoting Respect for International Humanitarian Law: A Handbook for Malaysian Parliamentarians", the book aims to serve as a reference for Malaysian parliamentarians in carrying out relevant roles, as well as a general introduction to IHL and the ICRC, the MRCS and the International Red Cross and Red Crescent Movement particularly in Malaysia. The publication was also supported by the Ministry of Foreign Affairs, the Malaysian parliament and the Institute for Political Reform and Democracy (REFORM Malaysia), and the launch followed by a round-table discussion themed around the 60th anniversary of Malaysia's accession to the Geneva Conventions in 2022.

Overseas response and fundraising 
In response to the 2011 Japan earthquake and tsunami, the Malaysian Red Crescent collected donations amounting to over RM3 million and sent to the Japanese Red Cross Society.

The Malaysian Red Crescent Society appealed for donations and launched a relief effort in response to the 2015 Nepal Earthquake. Six volunteers also joined the Special Malaysian Disaster Assistance and Rescue Team (SMART) that responded to the disaster.

They also launched a relief effort in 2018 to help the victims of the earthquake and tsunami that struck Sulawesi, Indonesia.

Membership 

Membership of MRCS is open to all individuals without any discrimination based on nationality, race, class, gender, creed, language, age, disability, ethnicity, social background, political considerations or any other similar grounds. A Member who is of thirty years of age or below will be categorised as a Youth Member and may participate in the Youth activities of the Society and the Federation. People can join as life members or to renew their membership on an annual basis.

MRCS members are expected to affirm and abide by the Constitution of the Society, as well as adhere to and disseminate the Fundamental Principles of the Movement. Members are expected to promote the work of the Society. Members are able to vote as well as being eligible to stand for election to take up the position of an elected office. Members can present proposals and raise issues in accordance with the Regulations of the Society.

See also
 List of Red Cross and Red Crescent Societies
 International Federation of Red Cross and Red Crescent Societies

References

External links
 
 Malaysian Red Crescent (Incorporation) Act 1965
 Malaysian Red Cross (Change of Name) Act 1975

Medical and health organisations based in Malaysia
Red Cross and Red Crescent national societies
1948 establishments in Malaya
Organizations established in 1948
Non-profit organisations based in Malaysia
Nansen Refugee Award laureates